Le Tilleul may refer to the following communes in France:

Le Tilleul, Seine-Maritime, in the Seine-Maritime département 
Le Tilleul-Lambert, in the Eure département
Le Tilleul-Othon, in the Eure département
Tilleul-Dame-Agnès, in the Eure département